Matthew James Henry (born 14 December 1991) is a New Zealand professional cricketer who plays for Canterbury, and for the New Zealand national team. He is a right-arm fast-medium bowler.

Education
He was educated at St Joseph's School in Papanui and St Bede's College in Christchurch before completing his sixth form studies at St Joseph's College, Ipswich in England on a one-year scholarship.

Domestic and T20 career
Henry has played for Canterbury in New Zealand domestic cricket since 2011, making his first-class cricket debut in the 2010–11 Plunket Shield against Wellington in March 2011. He has played county cricket in England for Worcestershire for a period in 2016 and for Derbyshire in the 2017 NatWest t20 Blast and played for Kent as their overseas player in the first half of the 2018 season before agreeing to return to play at the end of the season for the club. After taking seven wickets on his Kent debut against Gloucestershire, Henry took his best innings and match bowling figures against Durham in late April 2018. He took five wickets in Durham's first innings and seven  in their second to record his first ten-wicket haul with match figures of 12/73. Henry was awarded his Kent cap during his first stint with the club.

In February 2017, he was bought by the Kings XI Punjab team for the 2017 Indian Premier League (IPL) for INR 5 million. He had previously signed for Chennai Super Kings in the IPL between 2014 and 2015 but did not play a match for the team.

In July 2019, he was selected to play for the Edinburgh Rocks in the inaugural edition of the Euro T20 Slam cricket tournament. However, the following month the tournament was cancelled. In November 2021, Henry was again signed to play for Kent, this time for the 2022 cricket season in England.

International career
Henry made his international debut on 31 January 2014 in the fifth ODI against India. He made his Twenty20 International debut for New Zealand against Pakistan in the United Arab Emirates on 4 December 2014.

Despite not being picked in the final squad of 15 for the 2015 Cricket World Cup, he was selected as a replacement for Adam Milne in the semi-final match against South Africa at Eden Park. He was wicketless in the match but against Australia in the final at Melbourne, Henry showed serious pace and took the two wickets of David Warner and Michael Clarke.
He batted with Jimmy Neesham to set the record for what is, as of March 2018, the highest 9th wicket partnership for New Zealand in ODIs, adding 84 runs as a pair against India in 2016.

Henry's Test debut for New Zealand came during the tour against England in May 2015.

In May 2018, he was one of twenty players to be awarded a new contract for the 2018–19 season by New Zealand Cricket. In April 2019, he was named in New Zealand's squad for the 2019 Cricket World Cup. On 3 July 2019, in the match against England, Henry played in his 50th ODI. In the first semi-final, New Zealand beat India by 18 runs, with Henry taking three wickets for 37, and being named the player of the match.

In February 2022, in the first match against South Africa, Henry took his first five-wicket haul in Test cricket, with 7/23.

References

External links
 

1991 births
Living people
People educated at St Joseph's College, Ipswich
New Zealand cricketers
New Zealand Test cricketers
New Zealand One Day International cricketers
New Zealand Twenty20 International cricketers
Cricketers at the 2015 Cricket World Cup
Cricketers at the 2019 Cricket World Cup
Canterbury cricketers
Worcestershire cricketers
Punjab Kings cricketers
Derbyshire cricketers
South Island cricketers
Kent cricketers